Ramil Ravilyevich Zaripov (born 3 May 1992) is a Russian football defender.

Club career
He made his debut in the Russian Second Division for FC Rubin-2 Kazan on 25 April 2011 in a game against FC Zenit-Izhevsk Izhevsk.

He made his Russian Football National League debut with FC Volgar Astrakhan on 6 August 2016 in a game against FC Dynamo Moscow.

References

1992 births
Footballers from Moscow
Living people
Russian footballers
FC Mika players
Russian expatriate footballers
Expatriate footballers in Armenia
FC Vityaz Podolsk players
FC Volgar Astrakhan players
Association football defenders
FC Lokomotiv Moscow players
FC Rubin Kazan players
FC Oryol players
FC Olimp-Dolgoprudny players